Thomas Andrew Franco (born April 14, 1980) is an American actor, artist, and the founder of the Firehouse Art Collective in Berkeley, California. He is the brother of actors James Franco and Dave Franco.

Early life and education
Franco was born in Palo Alto, California. His mother, Betsy Lou (née Verne), is a writer and occasional actress. His father, Douglas Eugene Franco (died 2011), ran a Silicon Valley business, and was a "philanthropic entrepreneur". Franco's father was of Portuguese (Madeiran) and Swedish descent. Franco's mother is from a family of Russian Jewish ancestry; her parents had changed the surname from "Verovitz" to "Verne." Tom is the middle child of three brothers; the older is actor, director, writer, and artist James Franco and the younger is actor and director Dave Franco. They were raised in Palo Alto.

Franco is a graduate of Palo Alto High School, class of 1998. He graduated in 2002 from University of California, Santa Cruz majoring in fine art, then attended California College of the Arts in Oakland, California, majoring in ceramics.

Career
Franco started acting professionally in the comedy horror film Basket Case 2 (1990), credited as Frog Boy. He subsequently appeared in A Peace of History (2005) and The Devil Wears a Toupee (2007). He had a small role in The Disaster Artist (2017), in which his brothers played the lead roles.

Franco is the founder and co-director of Berkeley's Firehouse Art Collective. He shared directorship with his wife Julia Lazar Franco who died in 2014.

Personal life
Franco's first wife, Julia Lazar, worked closely with him. Her death was a result of liver failure (brought on by hepatitis C and liver cancer) and kidney trouble. The two were married in a hospital solarium about a month before her death. In 2021, Franco married Iris Torres, a film producer.

References

External links
 

Living people
21st-century American male actors
American male film actors
American male television actors
American people of Portuguese descent
American people of Russian-Jewish descent
American people of Swedish descent
Place of birth missing (living people)
1980 births
Jewish American male actors
Male actors from Palo Alto, California
People of Madeiran descent
University of California, Santa Cruz alumni
California College of the Arts alumni
Palo Alto High School alumni
21st-century American Jews